Mladen Petrov Chervenyakov (born 22 August 1954) is a Bulgarian politician and Member of the European Parliament (MEP). Chervenyakov is a member of the Coalition for Bulgaria, part of the Party of European Socialists, and became an MEP on 1 January 2007 with the accession of Bulgaria to the European Union.

External links
European Parliament profile

1954 births
Living people
Coalition for Bulgaria MEPs
MEPs for Bulgaria 2007
Place of birth missing (living people)